The Natural History Museum of Geneva is a natural history museum in Geneva, Switzerland.

Louis Jurine’s collections of Hymenoptera, Coleoptera, Lepidoptera and Hemiptera are held by the museum.

Other displays include a collection of intricate glass models of invertebrates by Leopold and Rudolf Blaschka and a living specimen of a two headed tortoise named Janus. The tortoise is considered the mascot of the museum and is one of their main attractions.

Notable people who worked for the museum
Aloïs Humbert,  naturalist and paleontologist, curator since 1852
Auguste Louis Brot, malacologist, curator and researcher (1855-1896)
Emil Frey-Gessner, entomologist,  conservator of the entomological collections from 1872
Émile Dottrens, scientific assistant for zoology
François Jules Pictet de la Rive, curator of paleontological collections
Henri Louis Frédéric de Saussure, member of the managing committee
Jules Favre, curator (1915-1952)
Perceval de Loriol,  paleontologist and stratigraphist, associated with the museum for over 40 years
Peter J. Schwendinger, curator
Pierre Revilliod, curator and researcher

Collections of a number of prominent scientists are held in the museum.

References

Aellen, W., 1970. 150 ans du Muséum d'Histoire naturelle de Genève. A. Kundig Genève.
Sigrist, R., 1990. Les origines de la Société de Physique et d'Histoire naturelle (1790–1822). La science genevoise face au modèle français, Genève. Mémoires de la SPHN, 45/1.
Sigrist, R., 1995. Les origines du Muséum d'histoire naturelle: 1794–1820. Revue des Musées de Genève. (No spécial: Le Muséum d'histoire naturelle de Genève : 175 ans), 335, juin: 2–6.

External links

Official website

Museums with year of establishment missing
Museums in Geneva
Natural history museums in Switzerland